Katharsis may refer to:

 Catharsis or katharsis, a Greek word meaning "cleansing" or "purging"
 Katharsis (journal), an Israeli periodical
 Katharsis, one of the members of the fictional rogue team The Disgraced
 Katharsis (video game), a 1997 Polish action game

Music
 Katharsis (band), a German black metal band
 Katharsis (album), a 1976 album by Czesław Niemen
 "Katharsis", a song by Doda from Diamond Bitch
 "Katharsis", a song by Tōru "TK" Kitajima

See also 
 Catharsis (disambiguation)